Yiyang railway station is a railway station of Hangchangkun Passenger Railway located in Yiyang County, Shangrao, Jiangxi Province, China.

Railway stations in Jiangxi
Railway stations in China opened in 1963